Slobodan Anđelković (1 March 1913 – 6 December 1985) was a Yugoslav football player.

Born on March 1, 1913, in Belgrade, Kingdom of Serbia, he played most of his career as defender and occasionally as winger.  He wore the red dress of SK Jugoslavija between 1935 and 1941.

He made one appearance for the Yugoslav national team in a friendly match played in Belgrade on June 6, 1937, in a 1-1 draw against Belgium.

Later in his life he worked in the Serbian newspaper Politika.  He died on December 6, 1985 in Sombor.

References

1913 births
1985 deaths
Footballers from Belgrade
Yugoslav footballers
Yugoslavia international footballers
Association football defenders
SK Jugoslavija players
Yugoslav First League players